Echinolittorina peruviana is a species of sea snail, a marine gastropod mollusk in the family Littorinidae, the winkles or periwinkles.

References

Littorinidae
Taxa named by Jean-Baptiste Lamarck
Gastropods described in 1822